Zen, sold as Tencho no Igo (literally Zenith Go) in Japan, is a closed source Go playing engine developed by Yoji Ojima (尾島陽児), a Japanese Go programmer.

History to 2016
Zen won a gold medal in 14th Computer Olympiad in May 2009. It won the Computer Go UEC Cup in 2011, 2014, and 2016. 

In 2011, Zen19D reached 5 dan on the KGS Go Server, playing games of 15 seconds per move. The account which reached that rank uses a cluster version of Zen running on a 26-core machine.

In 2012, Zen beat Takemiya Masaki 9p by 11 points (it received five handicap stones), followed by a 20-point win (receiving four handicap stones) in the 6th E&C Symposium in Japan.

Zen defeated Kobayashi Koichi (Zen receiving three handicap stones) in the 4th Densei-sen on 23 March 2016.

Zen's first commercial version was released in Japan on 18 September 2009. Zen 2 was released on 27 August 2010, Zen 3 on 30 September 2011, Zen 4 on 27 July 2012, and Zen 5 on 13 December 2013.

2016 onwards: DeepZenGo

After the AlphaGo AI defeated professional players Fan Hui 2p and Lee Sedol 9p in 2015 and 2016, Yoji was inspired to upgrade Zen with deep learning algorithms. In November 2016, “DeepZenGo” played and lost a three-game match against Cho Chikun 9p; the AI won one game and lost the other two. Its win in that match made it the second Go-playing computer program (after AlphaGo) to win against a top human player without receiving handicap stones.

In March 2017, DeepZenGo played games against Mi Yuting, Park Junghwan, and Iyama Yuta, losing to Mi and Park, but defeating Iyama. Around the same time, DeepZenGo participated in the 2017 Computer Go UEC Cup, coming second behind Fine Art. Both programs then won their exhibition matches against Ichiriki Ryo, 7-dan Japanese professional.

Example game

DeepZenGo (white) v. Ichiriki Ryo (26 March 2017), DeepZenGo won by resignation; Black's bottom left group is dead.

References

Go engines